Bhutan is a landlocked country and the second largest Himalayan state in Asia. Located in the Eastern Himalayas, it is bordered by China in the north and India in the south. Bhutan is separated from Nepal by the Indian state of Sikkim and from Bangladesh by the Indian states of West Bengal and Assam. With over 700,000 inhabitants, its population is the seventh largest in South Asia. Thimphu is its capital and largest city, while Phuntsholing is its financial and commercial center. 

Bhutan has the second highest per capita income in South Asia after the Maldives. Hydroelectricity accounts for the major share of its exports. The government is a parliamentary democracy.

Notable firms 
This list includes notable companies with primary headquarters located in the country. The industry and sector follow the Industry Classification Benchmark taxonomy. Organizations which have ceased operations are included and noted as defunct.

References 

Bhutan